Rage Against the Machine is an American rock band from Los Angeles, California. Formed in 1991, the group consists of vocalist Zack de la Rocha, guitarist Tom Morello, bassist Tim Commerford and drummer Brad Wilk. After a self-issued demo, the band signed with Epic Records and released its self-titled debut album Rage Against the Machine in 1992, the material for which was written by all four members of the group. After contributing the single "Year of tha Boomerang" to the Higher Learning soundtrack in 1995, the band released its second studio album Evil Empire in 1996, on which "Year of tha Boomerang" was featured as the closing track.

In 1997 the band released a cover version of Bruce Springsteen's "The Ghost of Tom Joad", and the following year contributed "No Shelter" to the soundtrack to the film Godzilla, as well as releasing it as a single. In 1999 the band released its final album of original material, The Battle of Los Angeles, which again credited all four members equally for songwriting. The group disbanded in October 2000, after de la Rocha departed to focus on producing his first solo album. After the group's breakup, Epic released Renegades in December 2000, which featured cover versions of songs originally recorded by several hip hop artists, rock bands and other artists.

Songs

See also
Rage Against the Machine discography

Notes

References

External links
Official band website
List of Rage Against the Machine songs at AllMusic

Rage Against the Machine